Mordellistena texana is a species of beetle in the genus Mordellistena of the family Mordellidae. It was described by Smith in 1882.

References

External links
Coleoptera. BugGuide.

Beetles described in 1882
texana